Barzeh  or Barza (also transliterated  Berzé) is a municipality and a neighborhood to the north of Damascus, Syria. According to the Syria Central Bureau of Statistics, Barzeh had a population of 47,339 in the 2004 census.

History
Barzeh's foundation dates back to at least Roman times. There is archaeological evidence of Roman and Aramean tombs in the area. Traditionally it has always been a town of the Ghouta, and therefore closely linked to agriculture. Rice, oil and olives and various types of fruit are produced. In the 20th century, it was absorbed into Damascus.

Syrian Civil War
The municipality has been active in the Syrian civil war. The Sunni Barzeh al-Balad neighborhood was largely pro-rebel. However, the neighboring Alawite "slum" Ish al-Warwar is largely pro-government. The Barzeh area has been under truce between the rebels and government since 2014. 

On 1 April 2015, the rebels (Jaish al-Islam and the Free Syrian Army's First Brigade) launched a military campaign to expel the Islamic State of Iraq and the Levant from the Barzeh and Qaboun neighborhoods, which ended in success three days later. On 8 February 2016, an IS car bomb targeting a government officer's club killed eight people in Masakin Barzeh.
On 29 May 2017 the Syrian government regained control of the entire district.

Neighborhoods
Al-Abbas (pop. 23,112)
Barza al-Balad (pop. 31,634)
Ish al-Warwar (pop. 20,458)
Al-Manara (pop. 10,199)
Masakin Barzeh (pop. 15,705)
An-Nuzha (pop. 6,488)

Population 
1922: 2000 inhabitants 
1935: 3500 inhabitants 
1950: 4,239 inhabitants 
1960: 6554 inhabitants 
2004: 47,339 inhabitants

Education
The Higher Institute for Applied Sciences and Technology has its main campus in the Hameesh area of Barzeh.

References

Neighborhoods of Damascus